Retaliation (formerly known as Invalid Injection) is a German death metal band from Lower Franconia, Bavaria, formed in 2005. The band was founded by Julian Welsch and Sven Lutz under its former name, before renaming and re-branding in 2006.

The band's debut album, Seven, was released in August 2010.

Members 
 Johannes Schwarzkopf – vocals (?–present)
 Christian Schlosser – vocals (?–present)
 Heiko Heckner – bass (?–present)
 Dennis Schneider – guitar (2008–present)
 Florian Wehner – guitar (2011–present)
 Marc Schuhmann – drums (2008–09, 2009–present)

Discography

Albums
 Seven (full-length, 2010), Unique Leader Records

Demos/EP
 Enticing  (EP, 2008), Rising Nemesis Records

References

External links
 
 

Musical groups established in 2005
German death metal musical groups